Diary of a Wimpy Kid: Hard Luck is a children's novel written by Jeff Kinney and the eighth book in the Diary of a Wimpy Kid series. It was released on November 5, 2013. In this book, Greg's best friend Rowley ditches him, and Greg struggles to make new friends. On Easter, he finds a Magic 8-Ball and attempts to change his luck by using it to make decisions for him. Hard Luck received generally positive reviews from critics and was the bestselling book of 2013.

Plot

Hard Luck is the eighth installment of the Diary of a Wimpy Kid book series. The series follows a middle school student named Greg Heffley and the various problems he encounters. The book is outlined with simple, black-and-white illustrations. Hard Luck is a direct sequel to the previous book, The Third Wheel, which is about Greg and his best friend Rowley taking a girl named Abigail to a Valentine's Day dance.

Hard Luck opens with Greg recalling his mother's words that "friends will come and go but family is forever." He agrees with this statement, as Rowley has been refusing to hang out with him and agreeing with everything Abigail says since they started going out. Getting bored without Rowley, Greg takes his mother's advice to "branch out" and meet the kids in the neighborhood. He chooses to befriend his strange neighbour named Fregley. After Greg tries to get him to be funny during lunch, Fregley becomes popular with other students when they find out that he can "chew" food with his belly button.

After school, Greg's mother announces that her extended family will come to town for Easter. Greg talks about Meemaw, one of his relatives, who organized egg hunts in the backyard. On Easter, the family notices a discrepancy between photos in an album; an image of Meemaw putting objects in eggs depicts her wearing a diamond ring, although she is not wearing it in a later photograph. They realize that she hid her ring in an Easter egg and rush to find it, although the search is unsuccessful. Greg's mother hopes that nobody locates it, worrying that someone will sell the ring for money and divide the family.

On Easter, Greg discovers a Magic 8-Ball toy. He uses it to make decisions and ends up joining the Yearbook Club at his middle school. The next day, Greg accidentally drops his Magic 8-Ball, breaking it. At school, Greg is called to take yearbook photos of Fregley (Most Popular) and Rowley and Abigail (Cutest Couple). This causes him to resign from his position.

Finding it useless, Greg throws his Magic 8-Ball into his grandmother's yard. After finding out that Rowley and Abigail have broken up, Greg wonders if he and Rowley should be friends again. He goes back to the Magic 8-Ball, hoping that it is still functional. As he is about to shake it, he notices the plastic egg with Meemaw's diamond ring in it. He is worried that his family will start fighting over the ring as his mother predicts, so he hides the egg in his mother's closet.

Greg concludes that he has to make big decisions on his own, and reconciles with Rowley. He writes, "I know Mom's always saying that friends come and go and family is forever, and maybe that's true. [...] I'm sure me and Rowley will get in another fight somewhere down the road and then we'll go through this drama all over again. But for now, we're good."

Background
Teaser artwork for Hard Luck, depicting Greg Heffley holding an umbrella while Magic 8-Balls fall around him, was released in March 2013. On August 8, 2013, the book's cover and official title, Hard Luck, were revealed, along with the release date of November 5, 2013. Author and illustrator of Hard Luck, Jeff Kinney, also announced that he would begin a tour that same month to encourage pre-sales of the book.

Kinney later stated that he found it challenging to write for one of the book's characters, Rowley's girlfriend Abigail, as she was "meant to be a placeholder for a girlfriend rather than a fully developed character" and that "[i]t was a little tricky trying to figure out how to write for a character that hardly has any dialogue and not much of a personality. She's just a stand-in for a threat to Greg's and Rowley's friendship."

On the subject of the book's cover, Kinney stated that he chose the color green because the book takes place in spring and "the green in the Irish flag symbolizes the luck of the Irish."

Reception
Hard Luck sold 1.3 million its first week. It was the number one print bestseller of 2013, with over 3 million copies sold. However, it failed to reach the top 20 in eBook sales. Hard Luck had first printings of 5.5 million copies in the United States and 800,000 copies in the United Kingdom.

Hard Luck received generally positive reviews from critics. Booklist commented that "Kinney strikes his comic target in the bull’s-eye, exaggerating the trials of adolescence just enough to make them real while deftly exposing the insecurities behind Greg’s bravado with his super, simple drawings." Publishers Weekly wrote that the book's formula was similar to Kinney's prior books and that fans of the series would likely enjoy this one as well. Common Sense Media criticized the book for its use of toilet humour and gave it three out of five stars. The Guardian gave the book a score of four out of five and described it as "hilarious."

Irish Independent praised the book for its "laugh-out-loud scenes," such as when Greg worries about "get[ting] baked alive like a microwave burrito." They liked the book for "reflect[ing] children's real experiences," particularly "[t]he scenes where Greg struggles in school without a friend" for being "poignantly written" and that "Greg's predicament [about his family members fighting over Meemaw's ring] will resonate with all children (and their parents)." The reviewer concludes by calling Hard Luck "one of the funniest books I've read all year."

References

External links
 

Diary of a Wimpy Kid
American children's novels
2013 children's books
2013 American novels
Novels by Jeff Kinney
Amulet Books books
Puffin Books books